Phyllodistomum is a genus of flatworms belonging to the family Gorgoderidae.

The genus has cosmopolitan distribution.

Species:
 Phyllodistomum acceptum Looss, 1901 
 Phyllodistomum almorii Pande, 1937

References

Platyhelminthes